Sidi Boulaalam is a small town and rural commune in Essaouira Province, Marrakesh-Safi, Morocco.

At the time of the 2014 census, the commune had a total population of 8,142 people living in 1,561 households. This was up from the 2004 census of 7,880 people in 1,310 households.

The climate in Sidi Boulaalam is semi-arid, with cooler winters than the coast, freezing occurring in the winter, but it is warmer than the coast in summer. The Köppen-Geiger climate classification is BSk. The average total annual rainfall is only , with most of it occurring in the winter, and almost no precipitation in July and August.

Fifteen people were killed and many more injured there during a stampede for food in November 2017.

References

Populated places in Essaouira Province
Rural communes of Marrakesh-Safi